Thoracochaeta brachystoma is a species of fly in the family Sphaeroceridae, the lesser dung flies. It is found in the  Palearctic . Thoracochaeta brachystoma is a typical inhabitant of sea coasts. The larvae live in seaweed.

References

Sphaeroceridae
Insects described in 1854
Taxa named by Christian Stenhammar
Diptera of Europe